Chaffey is an unincorporated community located in the town of Summit, Douglas County, Wisconsin, United States.

Chaffey is located south of the city of Superior, and west of the village of Solon Springs. Wisconsin Highway 35 serves as a main route through the community.

History
The community was named for its first postmaster, John Chaffey, in October 1899.

Notes

Unincorporated communities in Douglas County, Wisconsin
Unincorporated communities in Wisconsin